Freeman Barr (born October 12, 1973) is a Bahamian former professional boxer who competed from 1993 to 2010, challenging for the WBO middleweight title in 1999.

Amateur career
The youngest of 13 children, Barr had only nine amateur bouts. He was nevertheless a two-time National Amateur Champion in the Bahamas. He represented the Bahamas at the 1990 Commonwealth Games.

Professional career
Barr made his professional debut on February 26, 1993. On January 30, 1999 Barr lost the bout for the WBO middleweight title against Germany's Bert Schenk.

Professional Highlights 
 Florida State Middleweight Champion  (Defeated Anthony Brooks on Sept. 28 1996)
 IBC Continental Middleweight Champion  (Defeated Andres Arellano Sandoval on Feb. 25 1997)
 IBO Middleweight Champion  (Defeated Jerry Brown on Sept. 20 1997)
 WBO-NABO Middleweight Champion  (Defeated Lee Fortune on June 2, 1998)
 WBO-NABO Super Middleweight Champion  (Defeated Gerald Coleman on Feb. 1 2000)

References

External links
 

1973 births
Living people
Bahamian male boxers
Middleweight boxers
Boxers at the 1990 Commonwealth Games
Commonwealth Games competitors for the Bahamas
People from Andros, Bahamas